Johan Gunnar Jansson (13 October 1897 – 15 December 1953) was a Swedish hammer thrower who won a bronze medal at the 1934 European Championships. He competed at the 1932 and 1936 Summer Olympics and finished in 7th and 12th place, respectively. Jansson held Swedish titles in the hammer throw in 1931, 1933–35 and 1937 and in the weight throw in 1929–31, 1933–35, 1937 and 1938.

References

1897 births
1953 deaths
Swedish male hammer throwers
Olympic athletes of Sweden
Athletes (track and field) at the 1932 Summer Olympics
Athletes (track and field) at the 1936 Summer Olympics
European Athletics Championships medalists
People from Lindesberg Municipality
Sportspeople from Örebro County
20th-century Swedish people